Everything I Love is the fourteenth studio album by Brazilian jazz artist Eliane Elias. The album was released on February 15, 2000 via Blue Note and EMI labels.

Reception 
Josef Woodard of Jazz Times wrote "The Brazilian-American pianist has been considering her roots on recent albums, drawing through lines from Brazil to jazz and back. The concept album basis takes a holiday, though, on her latest, Everything I Love. The title is not, in fact, a summation of the aesthetic program, as a sweeping statement of her musical affinities, but just the title song. The album is just an unpretentious and flowingly realized song set, on which the pianist spins off the familiar themes... Periodically, Elias slips into her relaxed phrasing as a vocalist...but her voice, nice as it is, is an adjunct to the main message here: the continuing maturation of an expressive jazz pianist, stretching out, assuredly and artfully, in trio territory."

Jim Santella in his review for All About Jazz commented, "Her light singing voice and light piano touch go hand in hand. Always clear and vibrant, pianist Eliane Elias creates modern mainstream quality every time out. This one is a love letter that she's put together to honor those who have inspired her." A writer of CMJ New Music Report stated, "Everything I Love is a blend of the mainstream, the high-quality artistry that is straight-ahead jazz playing (and occasionally singing) and the spirited, romantic quality that is her hallmark."

Track listing

Credits

 Eliane Elias – piano, vocals
 Rodney Jones – guitar
 Christian McBride – bass (1, 2, 11, 12)
 Marc Johnson – bass (3-10, 13)
 Carl Allen – drums (1, 2, 3, 11, 12) 
 Jack DeJohnette – drums (4-10)

References

External links

2000 albums
Eliane Elias albums
Blue Note Records albums
Vocal jazz albums